Jakubov, Jakubow or Yakubov is a Slavic masculine surname. Its feminine counterpart is Jakubova, Jakubowa or Yakubova. It may refer to:
Alexander Jakubov (born 1991), Czechoslovak football striker
Apollinariya Yakubova (died 1913 or 1917), Russian revolutionary
Ikram Yakubov, Uzbek intelligence officer
Jakub Jakubov (born 1989), Czechoslovak football goalkeeper
Lina Yakubova (1976–2011), Armenian documentary film producer and writer
Maryam Yakubova (1929–1987), Uzbekistani stage and film actress
Maryam Yakubova, Uzbekistani educator
Mikhail Yakubov (born 1982), Russian ice hockey player 
 Tom Yaacobov (born 1992), Israeli triple jumper
Odil Yakubov (1926–2009), Uzbek writer

See also
Jakubowski
Jakubów (disambiguation)